Juan Tomás de Boxadors (1703–1780) was the Master of the Order of Preachers from 1756 to 1777 and a cardinal from 1776 to 1780.

Biography

Juan Tomás de Boxadors began his career as a diplomat of the Kingdom of Spain to the court of Charles VI, Holy Roman Emperor. Following the death of his brother in the 1755 Lisbon earthquake, Boxadors had a spiritual crisis that resulted in his joining the Dominican Order. He taught Christian theology for a number of years, and then became a companion of Master Brémond.

At a General Chapter of 1756, the Dominican Order elected him as their master.  That chapter charged him with promoting the use of the rosary, and Boxadors did so faithfully.  He completed a visitation of the order's Spanish provinces.

He promoted the revival of Thomism with his letter "De renovanda et defendenda doctrina sancti Thomae" (1757) which was widely distributed in the Order. Lamenting deviations from Thomistic doctrine and demanding a return to the teachings of Thomas Aquinas, Boxadors charged Salvatore Roselli (1722–1784) with assisting the reform of education in the order. Roselli then wrote his influential Summa philosophica ad mentem Angelici Doctoris S. Thomae Aquinatis of 1777, which supplanted the major manuals of the day and continued to be the standard Thomistic text through its third edition in 1857–59.

In the wake of the Enlightenment, the Dominican Order was able to recruit fewer and fewer young men and women.  By 1758, there were only three novices in all of the Kingdom of France.  In 1765, Louis XV of France appointed a commission to reform the religious houses of France.  Boxadors futilely resisted these reforms.

Pope Pius VI made him a cardinal in 1775.

He died in 1780.

References

Spanish Dominicans
18th-century Spanish cardinals
Masters of the Order of Preachers
1703 births
1780 deaths
Cardinals created by Pope Pius VI
Dominican cardinals